Olubayo Adefemi (13 August 1985 – 18 April 2011) was a Nigerian professional footballer who last played for Skoda Xanthi.

International career 
Adefemi represented his country at the 2008 Olympic Games, playing all the games and scoring a goal in a semifinal match against Belgium. He was a member of the Nigerian Under 20 Team that came second behind a Lionel Messi-led Argentina Team at the 2005 FIFA World Youth Championship in the Netherlands. Adefemi played 5 out of the six matches Nigeria played, scoring 1 goal during play against Morocco in the semi-final.

Adefemi made his Senior National Team debut against Ireland on 29 May 2009.  Adefemi played his second senior game against France in a game that Nigeria won.

Statistics

Death 
On 18 April 2011 Olubayo died in a car crash while driving on Egnatia Odos, near the city of Kavala, Greece. He was on his way to Nigeria in order to finalise details of his wedding.

Titles 
 Vice World Champion 2005 U-20
 Israeli F.A cup winner with Hapoel Tel Aviv 2006
 Silver Medal 2008 Olympics

References

External links 
 

Delta Force F.C. players
1985 births
2011 deaths
Nigerian footballers
Nigeria international footballers
Footballers at the 2008 Summer Olympics
Olympic footballers of Nigeria
Olympic silver medalists for Nigeria
SC Rheindorf Altach players
Hapoel Tel Aviv F.C. players
Hapoel Jerusalem F.C. players
Hakoah Maccabi Amidar Ramat Gan F.C. players
Israeli Premier League players
Liga Leumit players
FC Rapid București players
US Boulogne players
Nigerian expatriate footballers
Expatriate footballers in France
Expatriate footballers in Israel
Expatriate footballers in Romania
Liga I players
Bendel Insurance F.C. players
Ligue 1 players
Nigerian expatriate sportspeople in Romania
Expatriate footballers in Greece
Road incident deaths in Greece
Sportspeople from Lagos
Yoruba sportspeople
Olympic medalists in football
Medalists at the 2008 Summer Olympics
Hapoel Bnei Lod F.C. players
Nigeria under-20 international footballers
Association football defenders